Ashley Cleveland (born February 2, 1957) is an American singer-songwriter best known as a background vocalist and gospel singer. Ashley Cleveland was born in Knoxville, Tennessee. She has been married to Kenny Greenberg since April 27, 1991, and has three children.

Career 
She sang "We're Gonna Win This One" in 1987 for the Touchstone Pictures film Ernest Goes to Camp.

Her career includes vocal contributions to more than 300 albums, including the Dove Award winning albums Songs from the Loft (1994), The Jesus Record by Rich Mullins and A Ragamuffin Band, 1998.

As part of John Hiatt's band, she has also made several widely seen television appearances including, Austin City Limits, Late Night with David Letterman, The Arsenio Hall Show and Saturday Night Live.

Steve Winwood contributed duet vocals and played the Hammond B3 organ for the song "I Need Thee Every Hour" on Cleveland's 2005 album, Men and Angels Say.

She has contributed to the SongwritingWith:Soldiers workshops, and is credited as a co-writer on the song "Stronger Together" on the Mary Gauthier album Rifles & Rosary Beads.

Bibliography
In 2013 she published her memoir, Little Black Sheep, in hardcover, & eBook format.

Awards and recognition 
As the Grammy Award's first female nominee in the Best Rock Gospel category, Ashley Cleveland won this award in 1996 for her album Lesson of Love, in 1999 for You Are There, and in 2008 for Before the Daylight's Shot. She is the only artist to be nominated, and win, three times in this category.

In 2010, God Don't Never Change, was nominated for a Grammy Award in the Best Traditional Gospel Album category, bringing her total number of overall nominations to four (with three wins).

Lesson of Love also won a 1996 Nashville Music Award ("Nammy") for Best Contemporary Christian Album.

Cleveland was the only female vocalist to sing lead on a song ("Gimme Shelter") for the television special, Stone Country: A Tribute to the Rolling Stones on the defunct The Nashville Network (TNN).

Discography 
Albums
 Big Town Atlantic (1991)
 Bus Named Desire (Reunion (1993)
 Lesson of Love Reunion (1995)
 You Are There Warner (1998)
 Second Skin 204 Records (2002)
 Men and Angels Say Rambler (2005)
 Before the Daylight's Shot 204 Records (2006)
 God Don't Never Change Koch Records (2009). The album includes the songs:
 "Denomination Blues"
 "God Don't Never Change"
 Beauty in the Curve (2012)
 One More Song (2018)

Appearances
 Strong Hand of Love, tribute to Mark Heard, 1994
 Orphans of God, tribute to Mark Heard, 1996
 The Jesus Record, Rich Mullins & A Ragamuffin Band, 1998
 Mountain of God, Third Day Wherever You Are, 2005
 Both Feet On the Ground, Bellsburg Sessions Bellsburg (The Songs of Rich Mullins), 2022

References

External links 
 

1957 births
Living people
Musicians from Knoxville, Tennessee
Musicians from Nashville, Tennessee
American women singer-songwriters
Grammy Award winners
American performers of Christian music
Singer-songwriters from Tennessee
21st-century American women singers
21st-century American singers